Mrauk U is a town in northern Rakhine State, Myanmar. It is the capital of Mrauk-U Township, a subregion of the Mrauk-U District.

Mrauk U is of great cultural importance to the local Rakhine (Arakanese) people, and is the location of many important archeological sites. From 1430 until 1785, it was the capital of the Mrauk U Kingdom, the largest and most powerful Rakhine kingdom in history.

Geography 
The town is located on a small outcrop of the Rakhine Yoma on the eastern side of the Kaladan's alluvial plain. Thus, the surrounding countryside is hilly yet also contains a great deal of marshes, mangroves and lakes.

Climate 
Mrauk U, like all of Rakhine State, is situated in a coastal tropical monsoon rainforest climate (Köppen Am) region. The Monsoon season usually begins in late May and ends by mid October.

Although located in a tropical region, Mrauk U enjoys lower temperatures during the arid Northeastern Monsoon. This season coincides with the tourist season for Myanmar.

There was flood because of continuous heavy rains in July 2011.

Etymology 
Some Rakhine scholars state that the name Mrauk U means 'The First Accomplishment' in archaic Arakanese. This is based on the story of the Arakanese being able to crush an invasion by the Pyu in the mid 10th Century by a Mro prince, Pai Phru. The town is said to be located roughly near the region where the Pyu invaders were decimated. The prince went on to claim the throne of Waithali from his uncle who had murdered the prince's father due to a love scandal. The battle was seen as the first accomplishment of the prince, and thus, the name 'First Accomplishment' came to be associated with the place.

Mythology 
A dismissed myth was that in the region where Mrauk U was to be constructed, lived a lonely female monkey. She met a peacock and the two later cohabited. The female monkey conceived with the peacock, and it laid an egg. A human son was born from the egg and he grew up to become a mighty prince. The prince later built a city near the jungle, and in respect of his birth story, the city was called Myauk-U meaning "Monkey's Egg".

History 

In 1430, King Min Saw Mon established Mrauk U as the capital of the last unified Arakanese Kingdom. The city eventually reached a size of 160,000 in the early seventeenth century. Mrauk U served as the capital of the Mrauk U kingdom and its 49 kings till the conquest of the kingdom by the Burmese Konbaung Dynasty in 1784.

Mrauk-U was divided into three periods: the earliest period (1430–1530), the middle period (1531–1638), and the last period (1638–1784). In Arakan antiquities at the Mrauk-U seems to give rational evidence as to where Buddhism was settled down. The golden days of Mrauk U city, those of 16th and 17th centuries were contemporary to the days of Tudor kings, the Moghuls, the Ayutthaya kings and Ava (Inwa), Taungoo and Hanthawaddy kings of Myanmar. Mrauk U was cosmopolitan city, fortified by a 30-kilometer long fortification and an intricate net of moats and canals. At the centre of the city was the Royal Place, looming high over the surrounding area like an Asian Acropolis. Waterways formed by canals and creeks earned the fame of distinct resemblance to Venice.

Mrauk U offers some of the richest archaeological sites in Southeast Asia. These include stone inscriptions, Buddha images, the Buddha's footprints and the great pagoda itself which, stripped its later-constructed top, would be of the same design as the Gupta style of ancient India. In the city of golden Mrauk-U there are scattering innumerable temples and pagodas which preserved as places, thereby exerting a great influence on spiritual life of the people.

During British colonial rule, Mrauk U was known as "Mrohaung" or "Myohaung". The area was the site of fighting during the Arakan Campaign, in the latter part of the Second World War.

On 16 January 2018, Rakhine protesters rioted near a government building in Mrauk U after a ban was issued by local authorities on an event that commemorated the anniversary of the Kingdom of Mrauk U's dissolution. In response to protesters attempting to seize the government building, police fired live ammunition into the crowd, killing seven and wounding twelve.

Trading 
Due to its proximity to the Bay of Bengal, Mrauk U developed into an important regional trade hub, acting as both a back door to the Burmese hinterland and also as an important port along the eastern shore of the Bay of Bengal. It became a transit point for goods such as rice, ivory, elephants, tree sap and deer hide from Ava in Myanmar, and of cotton, slaves, horses, cowrie, spices and textiles from Bengal, India, Persia and Arabia. Alongside Pegu and later Syriam, it was one of the most important ports in Myanmar up until the eighteenth century.

The city also traded with non-Asian powers such as Portugal and then the Dutch East India Company of the Netherlands. The Dutch East India Company (VOC) established trading relations with the Arakanese in 1608 after the Portuguese fell in favour due to the lack of loyalty of Portuguese mercenaries, such as Filipe de Brito e Nicote in the service of the Arakanese king. The VOC established a permanent factory in Mrauk U in 1635, and operated in Arakan till 1665.

At its zenith, Mrauk U was the centre of a kingdom which stretched from the shores of the Ganges river to the western reaches of the Ayeyarwaddy River. According to popular Arakanese legend, there were 12 'cities of the Ganges' which constitute roughly half of modern-day Bangladesh which were governed by Mrauk U, including Dhaka and Chittagong. During that period, its kings minted coins inscribed in Arakanese, Kufic and Bengali.

Much of Mrauk U's historical description is drawn from the writings of Friar Sebastian Manrique, a Portuguese Augustinian monk who resided in Mrauk U from 1630 to 1635.

Religion 
As Mrauk U and her kingdom prospered, the kings, ministers and peasants built many pagodas and temples around the town to reflect their devotion. Thus, Mrauk U houses a rich collection of temples and pagodas second only to the Central Burmese town of Bagan, in Myanmar. Most of Mrauk U's temples were constructed of hewn stone bricks, unlike the mud and clay bricks of Bagan.

The most notable temples in Mrauk U are the Shite-thaung Temple (Temple of 80,000 Images or Temple of Victory), Htukkanthein Temple (Htukkan Ordination Hall), the Koe-thaung Temple (Temple of 90,000 Images) and the Five Mahn pagodas.

In 2017, an international commission urged Myanmar to nominate Mrauk U for UNESCO World Heritage Site status. The proposal is backed by Kofi Annan and archaeologists are now cataloguing and protecting the city's many sites in preparation for nomination.

Temples 
The following are some of the famous and noteworthy religious buildings in and around the town.

 Shite-thaung Temple
 Htukkanthein Temple
 Koe-thaung Temple
 Andaw-thein Ordination Hall
 Le-myet-hna Temple
 Ratana-pon
 Five Man Pagodas
 Mingala Man Aung Pagoda
 Ratana Man Aung Pagoda
 Sakya Man Aung Pagoda
 Lawka Man Aung Pagoda
 Zina Man Aung Pagoda
 Sanda Muni Temple
 Bandula Kyaung Monastery

Although Mrauk U is a primarily Buddhist site, there are several religious buildings of other faiths. The most notable would be the old Shindhikhan Mosque, built during Min Saw Mon's reign, in the southeast of the town. Friar Manrique also mentions the presence of a Roman Catholic church and a small number of converts and foreign born Catholics (including ronin who were forced out of Japan due to persecution by the shogunate of Tokugawa Ieyasu)

Rice production 
The area around Mrauk U ranks second in the production of rice in Myanmar, after the Irrawaddy Delta.

Tourism 
Today, Mrauk U is a major archaeological and tourist destination. The main attractions are the temples and ruins around the town. The remains of the main palace roughly form the centre of the town.
The most popular mode for tourists to travel to Mrauk U is to take a domestic flight from Yangon to Sittwe and board a boat from Sittwe against the Kaladan River. The hotels in Mrauk U also arrange private boat services to and from Sittwe.

Infrastructure 
Although a tourist destination, most of Mrauk U has very basic infrastructure. It has a Township hospital, a Basic Education High School and a market. Like much of Rakhine state and the whole of Myanmar, Mrauk U has 24-hour electricity.

Gallery

See also 
 Dhanyawadi
 Waithali

Notes

References

Bibliography 
 The Land of the Great Image – Being Experiences of Friar Manrique in Arakan by Maurice Collis. 
 Pamela Gutman (2001) Burma's Lost Kingdoms: splendours of Arakan. Bangkok: Orchid Press,

External links 

 
  Map of Mrauk U

Populated places in Rakhine State
Buddhist temples in Myanmar
Kaladan River
Mrauk-U Kingdom
Tourist attractions in Myanmar
1430 establishments in Asia